At the 1984 Summer Olympics, two different gymnastics disciplines were contested.  In addition to the fourteen artistic gymnastics events contested, for the first time at the Olympics, a rhythmic gymnastics event was contested–the women's individual all-around.  All of the gymnastics events were held at UCLA's Pauley Pavilion in Los Angeles from July 29 through August 11.  Several teams who had qualified to compete were absent as a result of the 1984 Summer Olympics boycott, including the Soviet Union, Bulgaria, Cuba, Czechoslovakia, East Germany, Hungary, and North Korea.

This was the first time in Olympic competition that eight gymnasts were allowed to move onto an apparatus final, instead of the previous six.

The USSR and other satellite countries organized an 'Alternate Olympics' where the USSR, East Germany, Bulgaria, Czechoslovakia and other Soviet Bloc nations competed.

Artistic gymnastics

Format of competition
The artistic gymnastics competition at the 1984 Summer Olympics was carried out in three stages:

Competition I - The team competition/qualification round in which all gymnasts, including those who were not part of a team, performed both compulsory and optional exercises.  The combined scores of all team members determined the final score of the team.  The thirty-six highest scoring gymnasts in the all-around qualified to the individual all-around competition.  The eight highest scoring gymnasts on each apparatus qualified to the final for that apparatus.
Competition II - The individual all-around competition, in which those who qualified from Competition I performed exercises on each apparatus.  The final score of each gymnast was composed of half the points earned by that gymnast during Competition I and all of the points earned by him or her in Competition II.
Competition III - The apparatus finals, in which those who qualified during Competition I performed an exercise on the individual apparatus on which he or she had qualified.  The final score of each gymnast was composed of half the points earned by that gymnast on that particular apparatus during Competition I and all of the points earned by him or her on that particular apparatus in Competition III.

Each country was limited to three gymnasts in the all-around final and two gymnasts in each apparatus final.

Men's events

Women's events

Rhythmic gymnastics

Medal table

See also

Gymnastics at the 1982 Asian Games
Gymnastics at the 1983 Pan American Games
1983 World Artistic Gymnastics Championships
Gymnastics at the Friendship Games

References

External links
Official Olympic Report
www.gymnasticsresults.com
www.gymn-forum.net

 
1984 Summer Olympics events
1984
1984 in gymnastics